OpenMW is a free and open-source game engine recreation that reimplements the one powering Bethesda Softworks' 2002 open-world role-playing game The Elder Scrolls III: Morrowind.

Overview
The project aims to address issues with the original engine, as Morrowind has had no support or bug-fix updates for many years. The OpenMW engine is programmed in C++ and uses the Bullet physics engine, OpenAL-Soft for audio, MyGUI for window widgets, and SDL 2 for input. The launcher and OpenMW-CS tool use Qt for their graphical user interfaces.  All the quests and other character choices of Morrowind and its official expansions and add-ons are fully playable in OpenMW, as are many third-party mods.

As a game engine recreation, it therefore relies on but does not include the original assets of the game, such as art, textures, music, and other Bethesda-copyrighted material, meaning a copy of the original game (in any edition, including the Game of the Year Edition) is required to play Morrowind in OpenMW. Side projects have been started to create free assets to accompany OpenMW, and the OpenMW-CS content-development tool can also be used without the need for any third-party assets.

Due to the engine being developed primarily for Morrowind, as a replacement for the outdated Gamebryo engine some have attempted to port other Bethesda games into the Open-Source engine with varying success. As of February 28, 2019, demo videos showcase Skyrim and Oblivion's game worlds being loaded successfully into the engine. This has been led by a single programmer known as cc9cii.

History
The first public release of OpenMW was version 0.1.0 in June 2008, initially using Ogre3D for rendering. The original lead developer, Nicolay Korslund, left the project early on but passed his roles to Marc Zinnschlag. In 2020, the team officially announced that Bret Curtis (also known as psi29a) took over the leadership role.

With the release of version 0.37.0, Ogre3D was replaced with OpenSceneGraph due to concerns about the future direction of Ogre3D's development. This switch brought significant performance improvements and fixed several long-standing issues in the engine.

Since 2016, all of the quests, classes, races, and other character choices of Morrowind and its official expansions and add-ons are fully playable in OpenMW, though it remains in extended beta testing  Most third-party mods that are not dependent on any MS Windows executables and which are free of serious scripting syntax errors are also compatible with OpenMW.

TES3MP: multiplayer development
OpenMW is also the basis for TES3MP, an attempt to develop a networked, multiplayer version of the game. It was in early alpha testing  In the middle of 2017, a major breakthrough was achieved and a first playable version was released.

References

External links 

Free game engines
The Elder Scrolls
Game engines for Linux
Fangames